UCH Macmillan Cancer Centre is a research-led day hospital in Huntley Street in central London. It is the oncology (cancer treatment) wing of University College Hospital, part of the University College London Hospitals NHS Foundation Trust.

History
The building was designed by Hopkins Architects, with fundraising by Christopher Moran of Crosby Hall, London. £10 million of the estimated £110 million cost was a donation by the charity Macmillan Cancer Support, hence the name of the building; other funders include the Teenage Cancer Trust. It has links to UCL Cancer Institute, to ensure that its treatment is current. The building is modelled on American "daycare" facilities, such as the Memorial Sloan Kettering Cancer Center in New York. It occupies the site of the former maternity hospital, the Elizabeth Garrett Anderson and Obstetric Hospital, in Huntley Street. The centre opened in April 2012.

References

External links
 University College London Hospitals NHS Foundation Trust
 UCL Hospitals Charitable Foundation
 UCL Partners

Hospital buildings completed in 2012
University College London Hospitals NHS Foundation Trust
NHS hospitals in London
Teaching hospitals in London